"Midnight Hour" is a song by American record producer Skrillex, German DJ Boys Noize and American singer Ty Dolla Sign. It was released on August 29, 2019, via Owsla and Atlantic. It was nominated for Best Dance Recording at the 2020 Grammy Awards.

Background
In earlier August 2019, Skrillex post on Instagram and shared a video of 'Midnight Hour' with the caption "soon", after the track was first heard at Miami Music Week. The single was also accidentally leaked online prior to the official release date.

Composition
According to Billboard, 'Midnight Hour' is a musical composite that combine R&B, electro, hip-hop and steady house beat.

Charts

Weekly charts

Year-end charts

References

2019 singles
2019 songs
Songs written by Skrillex
Songs written by Ty Dolla Sign